Sebastián Martin Junior Trillini (born 16 April 1994) is an Argentine former road and track cyclist. He competed in the team pursuit event at the 2015 UCI Track Cycling World Championships. He won the silver medal in the under-23 time trial at the 2015 Pan American Road Cycling Championships.

Major results

2015
 2nd  Time trial, Pan American Under-23 Road Championships
2016
 3rd  Madison, Pan American Track Championships (with Rubén Ramos)
 4th Time trial, Pan American Under-23 Road Championships
2017
 2nd  Madison, Pan American Track Championships (with Tomás Contte)
 6th Time trial, Pan American Road Championships
2018
 8th Overall Vuelta del Uruguay

References

External links

1994 births
Living people
Argentine track cyclists
Argentine male cyclists
Place of birth missing (living people)